Early Cats and Tracks is the fourth EP released by electronica band Psapp. Unlike the band‘s other EPs, Early Cats and Tracks was released exclusively as a digital download through the iTunes Store rather than on vinyl record. The EP is often overlooked, possibly due to its digital distribution, and the fact that the only new track on the album is "In My Head". The band did not announce plans to release the EP on a more conventional format (such as CD or Vinyl).

Track listing

Personnel

Psapp

Carim Clasmann
Galia Durant

Additional personnel

Mark Glover - clarinet, "Dirt Is Falling"
Shawn Lee - vocals, "Grand Opening"

Notes

"Biskitt" was originally released on Do Something Wrong.
"Grand Opening" and "Do Something Wrong" were originally released on Rear Moth.
"Dirt Is Falling" and "Side Dish" were originally released on Northdown.
"Side Dish" was later released on the Hi EP.

External links
Psapp official website 
Psapp at Domino Records

2005 EPs
Psapp albums
Domino Recording Company EPs